Abbas Yales may refer to:
 Abbas Yales 1
 Abbas Yales 2